Acyl-protein thioesterases are enzymes that cleave off lipid modifications on proteins, located on the sulfur atom of cysteine residues linked via a thioester bond. Acyl-protein thioesterases are part of the α/β hydrolase superfamily of proteins and have a conserved catalytic triad. For that reason, acyl-protein thioesterases are also able to hydrolyze oxygen-linked ester bonds.

Function 
Acyl-protein thioesterases are involved in the depalmitoylation of proteins, meaning they cleave off palmitoyl modifications on proteins' cysteine residues. Cellular targets include trimeric G-alpha proteins, ion channels and GAP-43. Moreover, human acyl-protein thioesterases 1 and 2 have been identified as major components in controlling the palmitoylation cycle of the oncogene Ras. Depalmitoylation of Ras by acyl-protein thioesterases potentially reduces Ras' affinity to endomembranes, allowing it to be palmitoylated again at the Golgi apparatus and to be directed to the plasma membrane. Acyl-protein thioesterases, therefore, are thought to correct potential mislocalization of Ras.

Known enzymes 

Currently fully validated human acyl-protein thioesterases are APT1 and APT2 which share 66% sequence homology.
Additionally there are a handful of putative acyl-protein thioesterases reported, including the ABHD17 enzyme family. In the lysosome, PPT1 of the palmitoyl protein thioesterase family has similar enzymatic activity as acyl-protein thioesterases.

Structure 

Acyl-protein thioesterases feature 3 major structural components that determine protein function and substrate processing: 1. A conserved, classical catalytic triad to break ester and thioester bonds; 2. A long hydrophobic substrate tunnel to accommodate the palmitoyl moiety, as identified in the crystal structures of human acyl-protein thioesterase 1, human acyl-protein thioesterase 2 and Zea mays acyl-protein thioesterase 2; 3. A lid-loop that covers the catalytic site, is highly flexible and is a main factor determining the enzyme's product release rate.

Inhibition 
The involvement in controlling the localization of the oncogene Ras has made acyl-protein thioesterases potential cancer drug targets. Inhibition of acyl-protein thioesterases is believed to increase mislocalization of Ras at the cell's membranes, eventually leading to a collapse of the Ras cycle. Inhibitors for acyl-protein thioesterases have been specifically targeting the hydrophobic substrate tunnel, the catalytic site serine or both.

Research 

Current approaches to study the biological activity of Acyl-protein Thioesterases include proteomics, monitoring the trafficking of microinjected fluorescent substrates, the use of cell-permeable substrate mimetics, and cell permeable small molecule fluorescent chemical tools.

References 

Cell biology
Lysophospholipases
Peripheral membrane proteins
Post-translational modification